Chalkley is an English surname. It was originally given to people from a location most likely in Southern England, due to the abundance of chalk and the high occurrence of the surname in the area. Notable people with the surname include:

 Alfred Chalkley (1904–1971), English footballer
 Dean Chalkley (born 1968), English photographer
 Frederick Chalkley (1875–?), English association football player
 George Chalkley (1883–1963), English football player
 Dominique Provost-Chalkley (born 1990), English actress
 Joe David Chalkley (born 1993), English Physician - General Practitioner, GMC 7556578

References

English-language surnames
English toponymic surnames